Community High School is a public high school located approximately 1 mile (1.6 km) north of Nevada, Texas (USA). It is part of the Community Independent School District which covers much of southeastern Collin County. The district was a consolidation of schools in Nevada, Josephine, Copeville, and Lavon completed in 1948. In 2015, the school was rated "Met Standard" by the Texas Education Agency.

Athletics
The school mascot is the Braves/Lady Braves.  The mascot name, Lacone Jo, was selected in a 1986 student contest, and is taken from the first two letters of the towns within the district (LAvon, COpeville. NEvada, and JOsephine).

Community High School participates in the following sports:

 Baseball
 Basketball
 Cross Country
 Football
 Golf
 Powerlifting
 Soccer
 Softball
 Tennis
 Track and Field
 Volleyball

Drill Team
The Dazzlin' Dames drill team performs during half time at football games and also attend competitions. At their most recent competition, they received a total of 8 awards. They are directed by Miss Ashley Loyd.

Baseball
In 2015, the Varsity baseball team under the direction of Head Coach David Allen, returned the winning pride to Community ISD. Finishing second in district play and capturing a Bi-District Title.

Speech, Theatre and Debate
Community High School also has a Speech, Theatre and Debate program.
The program regularly participates in UIL tournaments. In December 2011, they hosted their 1st UIL tournament at Community. They also regularly receive multiple awards at tournaments, including sweepstakes.

Band
Community High School also has a successful band. They recently went to UIL competition and received an average rating of 1. They compete in many contests throughout the year.

References

External links
Community High School

High schools in Collin County, Texas
Public high schools in Texas